João Vitor da Silva or simply João Vitor (born 15 March 1983),  is a Brazilian central defender  for Brusque Futebol Clube.

He played for Paraná in the Brazilian Série A for 5 seasons, from 2003 to 2007.

Contract
11 April 2007 to 10 April 2008

External links
sambafoot
CBF

1983 births
Living people
Brazilian footballers
Esporte Clube Santo André players
Paraná Clube players
Esporte Clube XV de Novembro (Piracicaba) players
Sociedade Esportiva do Gama players
Brusque Futebol Clube players
Association football defenders